The plain white-eye (Zosterops hypolais) is a species of bird in the family Zosteropidae. It is endemic to Yap.

Its natural habitat is subtropical or tropical moist lowland forests.

References

plain white-eye
Birds of Yap
Endemic fauna of the Federated States of Micronesia
plain white-eye
Taxonomy articles created by Polbot